Amphitorna is a genus of moths belonging to the subfamily Drepaninae.

Species
 Amphitorna albipuncta Hampson, 1893
 Amphitorna brunhyala (Shen & Chen, 1990)
 Amphitorna castanea Hampson, 1891
 Amphitorna confusata Warren, 1899
 Amphitorna excisa Warren, 1897
 Amphitorna lechriodes Turner, 1926
 Amphitorna olga Swinhoe, 1894
 Amphitorna perexcisa Warren, 1923
 Amphitorna purpureofascia (Wileman, 1911)
 Amphitorna submontana Holloway, 1976
 Amphitorna trogoptera Rothschild, 1915

Former species
 Amphitorna rotundipex Hampson, 1891

References

Drepaninae
Drepanidae genera